Bedfordshire is a county in the East of England. It is bounded by Hertfordshire to the south-east, Cambridgeshire to the north-east, Northamptonshire to the north, and Buckinghamshire to the west. Geographically, it is mainly rural, but still the fourteenth most densely populated county of England, with over half the population living in the two largest built-up areas, Luton and Bedford. The county is governed by three unitary authorities, Bedford, Central Bedfordshire and Luton. The county town is Bedford, and the name is first recorded in the treaty in about 879 between King Alfred the Great and Guthrum, which divided English and Danish territory by a line which went through Bedford.

Much of Luton and southern Bedfordshire lies in the Chilterns Area of Outstanding Natural Beauty. North and mid Bedfordshire are undulating claylands with broad river valleys of the River Great Ouse and its tributaries, and the Bedfordshire Greensand Ridge. Jurassic and Cretaceous clays are overlaid by Quaternary glacial deposits of chalky boulder clay.

Local nature reserves (LNRs) are designated by local authorities under the National Parks and Access to the Countryside Act 1949. The local authority must have a legal control over the site, by owning or leasing it, or having a legal agreement with the owner. LNRs are sites which have a special local interest either biologically or geologically, and local authorities have a duty to care for them. They can apply local bye-laws to manage and protect LNRs.

As of March 2016 there are twenty local nature reserves in Bedfordshire: eight in Bedford, eleven in Central Bedfordshire and one in Luton. There is public access to all the sites.

Key

Other classifications
 CAONB = Chilterns Area of Outstanding Natural Beauty
 SM = Scheduled monument
 SSSI = Site of Special Scientific Interest
 WTBCN = Wildlife Trust for Bedfordshire, Cambridgeshire and Northamptonshire

Sites

See also

List of Sites of Special Scientific Interest in Bedfordshire
List of local nature reserves in England

Notes

References

 
Bedford